Macedonians in the United Kingdom refers to people from North Macedonia that have formed communities in or were born in the United Kingdom. The 2011 UK Census recorded a total of 2,983 residents who stated that their country of birth was Macedonia.

History of Macedonians in the United Kingdom

The majority of Macedonians in Britain arrived after the Socialist Federal Republic of Yugoslavia permitted emigration to the West in the 1960s and 1970s. Many Macedonians especially from the Demir Hisar, Bitola and Prilep regions left for Britain during this period. During the 1980s many professionals left Skopje to work in London for the Socialist Republic of Macedonia and for international organisations stationed there. Following the Breakup of Yugoslavia hundreds of ethnic Macedonians left for Britain. After the Yugoslav Wars in the 1990s many ethnic Macedonians and Albanians from the newly independent Republic of Macedonia left for Britain as refugees.

The 2001 UK Census recorded 1,285 people born in Macedonia. The 2011 UK Census recorded 2,882 Macedonian-born residents in England, 32 in Wales, 56 in Scotland, and 13 in Northern Ireland.

Organisations
Within the United Kingdom many ethnic Macedonian based organisations have been founded. Most notable is the "Association of Macedonians in the United Kingdom". This group has been key in organising events amongst the ethnic Macedonian community in Britain. They have also contributed to the consecration of the Macedonian Orthodox Church in London along with the Embassy of the Republic of Macedonia in London.

The most prominent Cultural and Artistic society within the ethnic Macedonians community in the United Kingdom is the ethnic Macedonian Cultural and Artistic Association "Sonce". It was founded in London on 17 November 2003.

Macedonian Orthodox Church

The Macedonian Orthodox Church "St. Archangel Michael & All Angels", was founded by immigrants from Macedonia in 1993. At first it organised liturgy only once a year for Easter, but in 2007 a resident priest was appointed. The following year, 2008, a chapel in Soho in London became the home of the Macedonian Orthodox Church and liturgies in Macedonian have been offered there at least once a month ever since. There have been plans to construct a Cultural Centre on the site of the Church.

In 2010 a Sunday church school for Macedonian was formed with a class of about 15 children. In 2014, three new classes opened, one in London, one in Littlehampton, and the third in Oxford.

Notable individuals

See also
 Macedonian diaspora
 Ethnic Macedonians
 North Macedonia–United Kingdom relations

References

External links
Macedonians in the UK
Embassy of the Republic of Macedonia in London
MCAA Sonce UK
Macedonian Orthodox Church London

 
UK
Immigration to the United Kingdom by country of origin